The 1976 Women's British Open Squash Championships was held at Wembley in London from 27 February - 4 March 1976. Heather McKay (née Blundell) won her fifteenth consecutive title defeating Sue Newman in the final.

Seeds

Draw and results

First round

Second round

Third round

Quarter-finals

Semi-finals

Final

References

Women's British Open Squash Championships
Women's British Open Squash Championship
Women's British Open Squash Championship
Squash competitions in London
Women's British Open Championship
British Open Championship
Women's British Open Squash Championship
Women's British Open Squash Championship